Jan Willem van Otterloo (27 December 190727 July 1978) was a Dutch conductor, cellist and composer.

Biography
Van Otterloo was born in Winterswijk, Gelderland, in the Netherlands, the son of William Frederik van Otterloo, a railway inspector, and his wife Anna Catharina van Otterloo (née Enderlé). He qualified to study medicine at Utrecht University but switched to studying cello and composition at the Amsterdam Conservatoire. While playing as a cellist in the Utrecht Stedelijk Orkest, he won a composition prize from the Concertgebouw Orchestra for his Suite No. 3, which he presented in his 1932 conducting debut, also with that orchestra. He held posts with the Utrecht Stedelijk Orkest, before being appointed chief conductor of the Residentie Orkest in The Hague (1949–1973).

He spent his last 11 years in Australia. From 1967 to 1970 he was chief conductor of the Melbourne Symphony Orchestra and in 1971 he was appointed chief conductor of the Sydney Symphony Orchestra, where he remained for the rest of his life.

Particularly prized for his performances of 19th and 20th-century music, he made numerous commercial recordings, mostly for Philips Records, with Residentie Orkest, Concertgebouworkest, Berlin Philharmonic, Vienna Philharmonic, Vienna Symphony, Orchestre Lamoureux and (on much rarer occasions) the Sydney Symphony.

He died in the Melbourne suburb of East St Kilda in 1978 from injuries suffered in an automobile accident. His body was flown to The Hague for cremation.

His notable students include Graham George and Miroslav Miletić.

Personal life
Van Otterloo was married and divorced four times in the Netherlands. He married Elisabeth ter Hoeve on 1 August 1935 (divorce 1938). On 22 April 1941 he married Anette Jacoba Adriana Heukers, with whom in December of that year he had a son, Rogier van Otterloo (1941–1988), who would become a well-known conductor in the Netherlands as well. He and Anette divorced in April 1943, but remarried 28 April 1944. They would have another son and two daughters, but divorced again on 20 September 1954. Ten days later he married Susanne Maria Anna Wildmann with whom he had another daughter. A month after his fourth divorce, he married Carola Gertie Ludewig (born 1945) on 12 August 1970 in Australia.

Compositions
Suite (1938)
Symphoniëtta for 16 Wind Instruments (1943)
Serenade (1944)

Discography
 Willem Van Otterloo and Residentie Orkest: The Original Recordings 1950–1960. 13 CDs. Challenge Classics, CC 72142
 von Weber,s Der Freischütz overture with the Residentie Orchestra in 1951 on Philips S 06003 R.

References

External links
Willem van Otterloo at the Australian Dictionary of Biography

1907 births
1978 deaths
Dutch conductors (music)
Male conductors (music)
Dutch cellists
Dutch composers
Dutch expatriates in Australia
People from Winterswijk
Road incident deaths in Victoria (Australia)
20th-century conductors (music)
20th-century composers
20th-century Dutch male musicians
20th-century cellists